Julian Józef Popowski (14 February 1904 – 9 July 1961) was a Polish cyclist. He competed in the individual and team road race events at the 1928 Summer Olympics.

References

External links
 

1904 births
1961 deaths
Polish male cyclists
Olympic cyclists of Poland
Cyclists at the 1928 Summer Olympics
Cyclists from Warsaw